D. orientalis  may refer to:
 Dactyloptena orientalis, the Oriental flying gurnard, a fish species found in the Indo-Pacific Oceans
 Dactylopteryx orientalis, a praying mantis species
 Dalbergia orientalis, a legume species found only in Madagascar
 Dinera orientalis, a tachinid fly species in the genus Dinera
 Dinocephalosaurus orientalis, a long necked, aquatic protorosaur species that inhabited the Triassic seas of China

Synonyms
 Dactylorchis orientalis, a synonym for Dactylorhiza foliosa, the richly-leaved dactylorhiza, an orchid species

See also
 Orientalis (disambiguation)